Aspilia kotschyi is an annual herbaceous species with ovate to narrowly lanceolate leaves and dark red-purple flowers commonly found Tropical Africa. It has a variety, Aspilia kotschyi var. alba which has white flowers.

Description 
Leaves are simple and opposite in arrangement and borne from the stem; leaf-blade is ovate to narrowly lanceolate, 3–16 cm long and 1–4 cm wide. Inflorescence is capitulum type, solitary, axillary or sessile clustered around the upper surface of leaves, it has ovoid bracts and small dark purple-brown ray and disc flowers; phyllary is green but brownish around the base.

Distribution 
Endemic to Tropical Africa, it occurs from Senegal eastwards towards Ethiopia and southwards up to Zimbabwe.

References

Flora of West Tropical Africa
Heliantheae